Jiju Antony  is an Indian film director.

Personal life
Jiju Antony was born in Kuzhur village, Trissur district, Kerala on 18 May 1973. Eli Eli Lama Sabachthani? (film),Jiju's critically acclaimed debut feature was well recognised in film festivals.

Film career
He made his first feature film Eli Eli Lama Sabachthani? (film)  produced by Kazhcha Chalachithra Vedi and co produced by Niv Art Movies in 2017.  The fund was raised through crowd funding The film was screened in many film festivals in India

References

External links
 

1977 births
Living people
21st-century Indian film directors
People from Thrissur